Robert-Jon McCarthy (born 30 March 1994) is an Irish-Australian former road cyclist, who competed professionally between 2014 and 2019 for the , ,  and  teams. He was born in Cork and moved to Australia with his family when he was 14.

McCarthy won the third stage at the 2014 Herald Sun Tour, and won the first stage at the 2014 Rás Tailteann.

Major results
2014
 1st Stage 1 Rás Tailteann
 1st Stage 3 Herald Sun Tour
2018
 1st Stage 2 Rás Tailteann

References

External links

1994 births
Living people
Australian male cyclists
Irish male cyclists
European Games competitors for Ireland
Cyclists at the 2019 European Games